Vadym Slobodenyuk (born 17 March 1981 in Rivne) is a Ukrainian runner. He competed in the 3000 m steeplechase event at the 2004 and 2012 Summer Olympics.

Competition record

References

External links
 

1981 births
Living people
Sportspeople from Rivne
Ukrainian male steeplechase runners
Olympic athletes of Ukraine
Athletes (track and field) at the 2004 Summer Olympics
Athletes (track and field) at the 2012 Summer Olympics
Competitors at the 2005 Summer Universiade